George Ryan Ross III (born August 30, 1986) is an American musician, singer, and songwriter best known for his work as the former lead guitarist, backing and lead vocalist, and primary songwriter of the American rock band Panic! at the Disco before his departure in 2009. He alongside former Panic! bassist Jon Walker formed the Young Veins later that same year, in which Ross was the lead vocalist and guitarist. They broke up in 2010.

Biography

Musical beginnings (1998–2004)
Born in Las Vegas, Nevada, Ross received a guitar for Christmas when he was 12, and began collaborating with best friend Spencer Smith who received a drum kit. Ross and Smith mostly covered Blink-182 songs with Ross on vocals. Their two-piece band was originally called Pet Salamander. Ross wrote lyrics to his first song when he was 14 years old.

They teamed up with Brent Wilson and another boy named Trevor Howell on guitar to make "Summer League" before they met Brendon Urie and formed Panic! at the Disco.

Panic! at the Disco (2004–2009)

Ross and Spencer Smith formed Panic! at the Disco in 2004, later joined by Brent Wilson and Brendon Urie. The band's debut album, A Fever You Can't Sweat Out was recorded between the time frame of June to September 2005 and was released on September 27, 2005.

With much success and touring of their debut album, the band went back into the studio in October 2007 to record what has come to be the band's second studio album, Pretty. Odd., which was released on March 25, 2008; the sound greatly differed to the band's debut album. This was the last studio album Ross has contributed to with Panic!, though he was given a writing credit on "Nearly Witches (Ever Since We Met...)," from the band's third studio album, Vices & Virtues, as the song's origins date back to before the departure of Ross and Walker from the band.

The Young Veins (2009–2010)

On July 13, 2009, Ross spoke with MTV about his split from the Panic! at the Disco. He stated that "the split had been in the cards for sometime now. It just took everyone a while to realize it". Ross told MTV that he and the remaining members of Panic! at the Disco are still good friends and had recently spoken over the Fourth of July weekend. Ross spoke about his and Walker's upcoming project as well. "He and Walker are writing and recording songs (with Pretty. Odd. producer Rob Mathes) at a lightning-quick pace, and they'll soon be revealing the fruits of their labor". Since then, their new band called the Young Veins has released their song "Change" onto the Internet.

On July 15, 2009, Ross told MTV that the new sound he and Walker are working on is, "They're more, uh, I wouldn't want to say 'heavy,' but I guess I would have to, in the sense of, like, early garage music and Kinks and stuff. The songs are shorter and faster, and I guess they're more rock and roll than flowery stuff". He talked about how there is probably not going to be any orchestration on the album, unlike Pretty. Odd., which was loaded with orchestration. He and Walker are also recording with the help of Alex Greenwald from Phantom Planet along with Panic!'s former touring keyboard player, Eric Ronick. According to Ross, he and Walker are trying to release their new single tentatively titled, "Change". However, Ross is contractually bound to Fueled by Ramen to provide new music whereas Walker is not. He wants to be released from his contract with Fueled by Ramen "because it doesn't seem like it's going to be the right place for this stuff, and I think everybody knows that, on both sides, [FBR President] John Janick included. It's just been taking some time to get worked out."

On October 16, Ross had an interview with MTV saying that their first record, Take a Vacation!, is done, and they are working to find a record company willing to release it.

The Young Veins were signed to One Haven Music and their debut was released on June 8, 2010. On December 10, 2010, the Young Veins entered on a hiatus period.

Solo project (2013–present)
In 2013, Ross released a two-track untitled demo EP as well as a couple of other songs through his official SoundCloud page. The description of the page says: "Thanks for waiting. I'm back now."

In 2018, Ross collaborated with Z Berg on the Christmas single "The Bad List". In an interview with Alternative Press regarding the single, Ross stated that he "...will be in the studio recording songs for his next solo release over the next few weeks and into [2019].".

Other projects

Ross appeared along with former bandmates Brendon Urie, Spencer Smith, and Jon Walker in the Gym Class Heroes music video for the song "Clothes Off!!". He also appears with them in the Cab's music video for "One of THOSE Nights", along with Fall Out Boy members Patrick Stump and Pete Wentz.

In 2011, Ross was credited as a composer on ex-band Panic! at the Disco album Vices & Virtues for the track "Nearly Witches (Ever Since We Met...)", a song that was originally created while Ross and Walker were still in the band. He also recorded a song titled "Superbowl Hero" with Alex Greenwald and Michael Runion under a new band, RAM (Ryan, Alex, Michael).

Ross also provided backing vocals for "Stuck In Love", a song from William Beckett's solo EP What Will Be in autumn 2012.

In 2012, Ross featured on More Amor's single "Beach Bones".

References

External links
 
 
 Official Panic! at the Disco website

American rock singers
American male singers
American rock guitarists
American male guitarists
People from the Las Vegas Valley
University of Nevada, Las Vegas alumni
Singers from Nevada
Living people
1986 births
Panic! at the Disco members
Guitarists from Nevada
Bishop Gorman High School alumni
21st-century American singers